Amatlain Elizabeth Kabua (August 15, 1953 Majuro, Marshall Islands) is an Ambassador, teacher and politician. She is the Permanent Representative of the Marshall Islands to the United Nations.

Immediately prior to her post at the UN, she was Ambassador to Fiji since 2009, Ambassador to Japan between 1997 and 2003, Mayor of the Majuro Atoll Local Government between 1986 and 1997 and a teacher at the Garapan Elementary School in Saipan (1978-1980).

Education
She attended Chaminade University of Honolulu; at Saint Francis High School, also in Honolulu; and at Mount Caramel High School in Saipan, Commonwealth of the Northern Mariana Islands.

References

Permanent Representatives of the Marshall Islands to the United Nations
Ambassadors of the Marshall Islands
Ambassadors to Fiji
Ambassadors to Japan
Chaminade University of Honolulu alumni
People from Majuro
Mayors of places in the Marshall Islands
1953 births
Living people
Women ambassadors